Rod, Rodney or Roderick Smith may refer to:

Sports
Rod Smith (sportscaster), sportscaster with The Sports Network
Rodney Smith (skateboarder), American skateboarder, co-founder of Zoo York
Rodney Smith (cricketer) (born 1944), English cricketer
Rodney Smith (wrestler) (born 1966), American Olympic wrestler
Rod Smith (ice hockey) (1894–1961), ice hockey player

Gridiron football
Rod Smith (wide receiver) (born 1970), American football wide receiver
Rod Smith (defensive back) (born 1970), American football defensive back
Rod Smith (running back) (born 1992), American football running back
Rodney Smith (wide receiver)  (born 1990), American football wide receiver
Rodney Smith (running back) (born 1996), American football running back
Rod Smith (Canadian football) (1925–2016), Canadian Football League player
Rod Smith (American football coach) (born 1973), American football coach and quarterback

Others
Rod Smith (politician) (born 1949), former Florida State Senator and Chair of the Florida Democratic Party
Rod Smith (R/C modeling pioneer) (born 1926), R/C modeling pioneer
Rod Smith (poet) (born 1962), American poet and editor (edits the journal Aerial and publishes Edge Books)
R. T. Smith (Rodney, born 1947), American poet and editor
Rodney Smith (photographer) (1947–2016), portrait photographer
Rodney "Gipsy" Smith (1860–1947), British evangelist
Rodney K. Smith, American academic
Roots Manuva (born 1972), British rapper born Rodney Smith
Rodney Smith, Baron Smith (1914–1998), British surgeon
Rodney Smith (judge) (born 1974), Federal judge in Florida